José María Barreda Fontes (born 4 February 1953) is a Spanish politician and historian. A member of the Spanish Socialist Workers' Party (PSOE), he served as President of the Junta of Communities of Castilla–La Mancha from 2004 until 2011. As of 2019, he works as senior lecturer of Contemporary History at the University of Castilla–La Mancha.

Biography
Barreda, who was born in Ciudad Real, is a descendant of a Spanish noble family and holds a doctorate in history and geography and a BA in philosophy and letters from the Complutense University of Madrid. He received a scholarship from the Spanish National Research Council to fund his post-doctoral research and is currently a tenured professor of contemporary history at the University of Castile-La Mancha.

Barreda met his wife, Clementina Díez de Baldeón, a socialist deputy for the Province of Ciudad Real, while still at university; the couple have two children.

Political career
Barreda's first elected position was to the municipal council of Ciudad Real, a post he held from 1983-1987. During that period, he was the Minister for Education and Culture in the first regional Government of José Bono. As a Minister, he oversaw the creation of the University of Castile-La Mancha, launched the regional network of libraries, cultural centres, theatres and auditoria, and organised the conversion of the library at the Alcázar of Toledo.

Barreda became the regional Minister for Institutional Relations in January 1988; he only held the portfolio for four months, however, as he became the region's vice-president in May of the same year. He served as vice-president until November 1989, when the Cortes of Castile-La Mancha—the regional parliament—appointed him to be one of the region's two representatives in the Spanish Senate. He returned to Castile-La Mancha in June 1991 to serve as the President of the Cortes Regionales. Barreda remained in the post until July 1997, when he was forced to resign following his appointment as the regional general-secretary of the Spanish Socialist Workers' Party. Following the 1999 regional elections, Barreda returned to his old post of vice-president of  Castile-La Mancha.

President of Castile-La Mancha
In April 2004, after more than 20 years as President of Castile-La Mancha, Bono was named as the Minister of Defence in José Luis Rodríguez Zapatero newly elected government. Barreda took over from Bono as President of Castile-La Mancha and was his party's candidate in the 2007 regional elections, where he retained his position, albeit with a reduced majority.

References

External links

Official website

|-

|-

|-

|-

1953 births
Living people
Academic staff of the University of Castilla–La Mancha
Presidents of Castilla–La Mancha
Presidents of the Cortes of Castilla–La Mancha
Members of the Senate of Spain
People from Ciudad Real
Complutense University of Madrid alumni
Spanish Socialist Workers' Party politicians
Government ministers of Castilla–La Mancha
Members of the 12th Congress of Deputies (Spain)
Members of the 2nd Cortes of Castilla–La Mancha
Members of the 3rd Cortes of Castilla–La Mancha
Members of the 4th Cortes of Castilla–La Mancha
Members of the 5th Cortes of Castilla–La Mancha
Members of the 6th Cortes of Castilla–La Mancha
Members of the 7th Cortes of Castilla–La Mancha
Members of the 8th Cortes of Castilla–La Mancha
Members of the Cortes of Castilla–La Mancha from Ciudad Real
Members of the Cortes of Castilla–La Mancha from Toledo
20th-century Spanish historians
Municipal councillors in the province of Ciudad Real
21st-century Spanish historians